Madaesan is a South Korean mountain that extends across Yeongwol County, Gangwon-do and Danyang County, Chungcheongbuk-do.

See also
 List of mountains in Korea

Notes

References
 

Mountains of South Korea
Mountains of Gangwon Province, South Korea
Mountains of North Chungcheong Province
One-thousanders of South Korea